Álvaro Santamaría (born 28 May 1950) is a Colombian former footballer who competed in the 1972 Summer Olympics.

References

1950 births
Living people
Association football forwards
Colombian footballers
Olympic footballers of Colombia
Footballers at the 1972 Summer Olympics
Independiente Medellín footballers
Footballers from Medellín